The Golden Gate Fields Turf Stakes was an American Thoroughbred horse race run annually at Golden Gate Fields in Albany, California. The race was open to horses four-year-olds and up willing to race one and three-eighth miles on the turf and offered a purse of $250,000 at its last running.

First run on October 18, 1947 as the Golden Gate Handicap, the inaugural race was won by Triplicate owned by Fred Astaire and ridden by future U.S. Racing Hall of Fame inductee Johnny Longden.

Over the years it was given a number of different names:
Golden Gate Fields Turf Stakes : 2008-2009
Golden Gate Fields Breeders' Cup Stakes : 2007
Golden Gate Fields Handicap : 2006
Stanford Breeders' Cup Handicap : 2005 (at Bay Meadows)
Golden Gate Breeders' Cup Handicap : 2001-2003
Golden Gate Handicap : 1947 - 2000

The race has been run at a number of distances;  miles from 1947-1950, 1952, 1955 and 1959-1961. It was run at  miles in 1951, 1954, 1956-1958, 1965-1967, 1993, 1997, 2001-2004 and 2006.

Records 
 
Speed record:
  miles - 2:13.00 - John Henry (1984)
  miles - 1:46.28 - Adreamisborn (2005)

Most wins by a jockey:
 4 - Russell Baze    (1982, 2000, 2005 & 2009)

Winners of the Golden Gate Fields Turf Stakes

References

Horse races in California
Golden Gate Fields
Graded stakes races in the United States